Fudania jinshanensis is a gram-positive species of bacteria from the family Actinomycetaceae which has been isolated from the faeces of an antelope (Pantholops hodgsonii).

References

Actinomycetales
Bacteria described in 2019
Monotypic bacteria genera